This is a list of United Nations Security Council Resolutions 1901 to 2000 adopted between 16 December 2009 and 27 July 2011.

See also 
 Lists of United Nations Security Council resolutions
 List of United Nations Security Council Resolutions 1801 to 1900
 List of United Nations Security Council Resolutions 2001 to 2100

1901